Arnaud Maire (born March 6, 1979) is a French football defender.

Career
Maire began his professional football career with Besançon RC. He joined AC Ajaccio late in his career helping the Corsican club gain promotion to Ligue 1 during the 2010–11 season, but he spent most of his spell in Ligue 1 on the substitute's bench.

References

External links

Profile at Soccerway

1979 births
Living people
French footballers
Racing Besançon players
SC Bastia players
RC Strasbourg Alsace players
AC Ajaccio players
USJA Carquefou players
Ligue 2 players
Sportspeople from Besançon
Association football defenders
Footballers from Bourgogne-Franche-Comté